Portugal has submitted films for the Academy Award for Best International Feature Film since 1980. The award is handed out annually by the United States Academy of Motion Picture Arts and Sciences to a feature-length motion picture produced outside the United States that contains primarily non-English dialogue.

Thirty-nine Portuguese films have been submitted to the Academy for consideration for the Academy Award for Best Foreign Language Film. As of the 94th Academy Awards, no Portuguese film has been nominated for the award; Portugal currently holds the record of the most submissions without an Oscar nomination. Almost one-fourth of Portugal's submissions (8 out of 37) have been directed by the prolific Manoel de Oliveira. However, the animated short film Ice Merchants, by João Gonzalez, was nominated for the Academy Award for Best Animated Short Film at the 95th Academy Awards, becoming the first Portuguese film production to do so.

Submissions
The Academy of Motion Picture Arts and Sciences has invited the film industries of various countries to submit their best film for the Academy Award for Best Foreign Language Film since 1956. The Foreign Language Film Award Committee oversees the process and reviews all the submitted films. Following this, they vote via secret ballot to determine the five nominees for the award. Below is a list of the films that have been submitted by Portugal for review by the Academy for the award by year and the respective Academy Awards ceremony.

Each year, the Portuguese nominee is selected by a jury selected by the Instituto do Cinema e do Audiovisual (in English, the Portugal Film Commission)., but 2012 was the first year the choice was made by the newly Portuguese Academy of Cinema.

All films were filmed in Portuguese except for 2007's French language Belle Toujours.

In 2003 Portugal submitted A Talking Picture which was filmed in a combination of English, French, Greek, Italian and Portuguese. In 2013 the candidate Lines of Wellington was filmed in a combination of Portuguese, English and French.

See also
List of Academy Award winners and nominees for Best Foreign Language Film
List of Academy Award-winning foreign language films
Cinema of Portugal

Notes

References

External links
The Official Academy Awards Database
The Motion Picture Credits Database
IMDb Academy Awards Page

Portugal
Academy Award
Academy Award